In industrial chemistry, a stabilizer or stabiliser is a chemical that is used to prevent degradation.

Overview
Heat and light stabilizers are added to plastics because they ensure safe processing and protect products against aging and weathering. The trend is towards fluid systems, pellets, and increased use of masterbatches. There are monofunctional, bifunctional, and polyfunctional stabilizers. In economic terms the most important product groups on the market for stabilizers are compounds based on calcium (calcium-zinc and organo-calcium), lead, and tin stabilizers as well as liquid and light stabilizers (HALS, benzophenone, benzotriazole). Cadmium-based stabilizers largely vanished in the last years due to health and environmental concerns.

Polymers

Some kinds of stabilizers are:
 antioxidants these prevent autoxidation of materials and come in 3 primary forms.
 Oxygen scavengers (primarily phosphite esters such as tris(2,4-di-tert-butylphenyl)phosphite) are commonly used during the initial processing of the plastic.
 Persistent radical scavengers prevent or slow the photo-oxidation of polymers. Traditionally these are alkylated phenols such as butylated hydroxytoluene but now also include hindered amine light stabilizers (HALS)
 Antiozonants prevents or retards the degradation of polymers caused by ozone (ozone cracking)
 sequestrants, forming chelate complexes and inactivating traces of metal ions that would otherwise act as catalysts
 ultraviolet stabilizers are used to protect polymers from effects of ultraviolet radiation and come to 2 main types.
 UV absorbers which essentially act the same way as sunscreens
 Quenchers, which dissipate the radiation energy as heat instead of letting it break chemical bonds; often organic nickel salts, e.g. nickel phenolates

Paints
 emulsifiers and surfactants, for stabilization of emulsions

Food
In foods, stabilizers prevent spoilage. Classes of food stabilizers include emulsifiers, thickeners and gelling agents, foam stabilizers, humectants, anticaking agents, and coating agents.

See also
 Corrosion inhibitor
 Stabilizers for polymers

References

Chemical kinetics
Chemical compounds
Material protection